FC Loviisa is a football club from Loviisa, Finland. The club was formed in 1992 and its home ground is at the Loviisan keskuskenttä, which can accommodate 500 spectators.

Background

The club was founded in 1992, following the amalgamation of the Loviisan Tor and Loviisan Riento football sections.  Loviisan Tor had the more significant history playing in second tier of the Finnish football system for two seasons in 1939 and 1966 and the third tier for five seasons covering 1974 and the period 1976–79.  FC Loviisa played one season in the Kakkonen (Second Division), the third tier, in 1994.

Season to season